Open water swimming at the 2022 World Aquatics Championships was held from 26 to 30 June 2022.

Schedule
Seven events were held.

All times are local (UTC+2).

Medal summary

Medal table

Men

Women

Team

References

External links
Official website

 
2022 World Aquatics Championships
Open water swimming at the World Aquatics Championships
2022 in swimming
Swimming competitions in Hungary